Stephen William Woolgar (born 14 February 1950) is a British sociologist. He has worked closely with Bruno Latour, with whom he wrote Laboratory Life: The Construction of Scientific Facts (1979).

Education 
Stephen Woolgar holds a BA (First Class Honours) in engineering and a PhD in sociology, both at the University of Cambridge.

Career
Woolgar was Professor of Sociology and Head of the Department of Human Sciences and director of CRICT (Centre for Research into Innovation, Culture and Technology) at Brunel University until 2000. He then held the Chair of Sociology and Marketing at the University of Oxford where he was a fellow at Green Templeton College. He is the former director of Science and Technology Studies within Oxford's Institute for Science, Innovation and Society. He is (2022) now retired from Oxford, and also from Linköping University where he worked more briefly in the late 2010s.

Contributions 
Woolgar is an important contributor in the fields of science studies, sociology of scientific knowledge (SSK) and the science and technology studies (STS) (especially on the topic of sociology of machines). He wrote Laboratory Life: The Construction of Scientific Facts (1979), a social constructionist account of the practice of science, together with Bruno Latour, who he first met in California when Latour was conducting hie early ethnographic work in scientific facilities.  Woolgar has subsequently adopted an even more relativist stance, for example in his 1988 book Science: The Very Idea. Woolgar espouses a radically relativist and constructionist position. In 1985 he wrote a paper proposing a sociological approach towards Machines and AI, in which he outlined the importance of tacking AI from the field of Sociology

Awards
 Recipient of the 2008 John Desmond Bernal Prize,  awarded annually by the Society for Social Studies of Science to an individual judged to have made a distinguished contribution to the field.
 Fulbright Scholarship and a Fulbright Senior Scholar award.  
 Academy of Social Sciences, 2010.

Selected bibliography

Books 
  Originally published 1979 in Los Angeles, by SAGE Publications
 
 
 
 
 
 
 
 Nigel Thrift, Adam Tickell, Steve Woolgar, William H. Rupp. (2014) Globalization in Practice. Oxford University Press.
 Annamaria Carusi, Aud Sissel Hoel, Timothy Webmoor, Steve Woolgar (eds.). (2020) Visualization in the Age of Computerization. Routledge.  
 Steve Woolgar, Daniel Neyland (2020). Mundane Governance: Ontology and Accountability. Oxford University Press. 
 Steve Woolgar, Else Vogel, David Moats and Claes-Fredrik Helgesson (eds. (2022) The Imposter as Social Theory – Thinking with Gatecrashers, Cheats and Charlatans. Bristol University Press. ISBN 978-1529213089

Chapter in books

Journal articles

References

External links
 Oxford home page
  Professor Steve Woolgar (short biography)
 Society for Social Studies of Science
 Institute for Science, Innovation and Society

1950 births
British sociologists
Academics of Brunel University London
Academics of the University of Oxford
Alumni of Emmanuel College, Cambridge
Fellows of Green Templeton College, Oxford
Living people
Sociologists of science
Social constructionism